Whitney: The Greatest Hits is a compilation album by American singer Whitney Houston, released in May 2000. The set consists of disc one with ballads and disc two with uptempo numbers and remixes, spanning the first 15 years of Houston's music career. Houston's performance of "The Star-Spangled Banner" at Super Bowl XXV, and 1988 Olympics tribute "One Moment in Time" are also included in the set. The collection includes four new songs—"Could I Have This Kiss Forever", duet with Enrique Iglesias, "If I Told You That", duet with George Michael, "Same Script, Different Cast", duet with Deborah Cox and "Fine"—all of which were released as singles. It also includes three other songs that had never appeared on a Houston album: "One Moment in Time", "The Star Spangled Banner", and "If You Say My Eyes Are Beautiful", a duet with Jermaine Jackson from his 1986 Precious Moments album. Along with the album, an accompanying VHS and DVD was released featuring the music videos to Houston's greatest hits, as well as several hard-to-find live performances including her 1983 debut on The Merv Griffin Show, and interviews.

Houston's compilation album had been in development for several years prior to its release. As early as 1995, Billboard listed Houston's Greatest Hits album as an upcoming release scheduled for October of that year. Billboard magazine mentioned a "long-promised" Greatest Hits collection again in July 1996, this time due that autumn. Speculation on the timing of the release continued into 1997, with Houston quoted that year as saying: "Oh, Clive is on my case about this greatest hits album. He's like, Whitney, we have to do a greatest hits album, I mean you're far long overdue."

Upon its release, Whitney: The Greatest Hits was a great commercial success and received generally good reviews, although some critics questioned the inclusion of some remixes on Disc Two instead of the original song versions. The album peaked within the top ten in most countries of the Americas, Europe, Asia, Africa, as well as Australia and New Zealand. It received numerous multi-platinum and platinum awards.

After Houston's passing in February 2012, it saw a resurgence in sales and re-entered album charts in many countries around the world. In the United States, it reached a new peak of number two on the US Billboard 200 chart. In July 2012, it was certified five times platinum by the Recording Industry Association of America (RIAA) for sales exceeding 2.5 million in the United States. Because it is a double disc album, it has had its discs counted separately for certification purposes by the RIAA. In Europe, the IFPI certified the album three times platinum in 2000 for sales exceeding 3 million copies.

In the United States, copies sold at Circuit City stores included a third disc containing new club remixes. Whitney: The Unreleased Mixes is a limited-edition four-record vinyl set, containing eight full club versions of selected remixes found on the American release. In June 2006, it was released digitally and re-titled Dance Vault Mixes: Whitney Houston – The Unreleased Mixes (Collector's Edition). In January 2011, the album was re-issued in Europe with the international track listing, and Canada, Australia and New Zealand with the American track listing, but the set was re-titled as The Essential Whitney Houston, as part of Sony Legacy's The Essential series. In addition to the title change, the re-release also features different artwork. The cover picture of the original release was taken by David LaChapelle.

Critical reception

Upon its release, Whitney: The Greatest Hits received generally positive reviews. CANOE reviewer Jane Stevenson stated that it is "a greatest hits package that makes good listening sense." Steve Huey from AllMusic showed some dissatisfaction with the second disc that included some remixes instead of the original versions, stating "the Greatest Hits disc amply reinforces once again what a fine singles artist Houston has been for the entirety of her career. Still and all, though, it's a frustrating package marred by record company greed." However, Jim Farber of the New York Daily News commenting on the second disc and the entire greatest hits package stated, "In her dance mixes, she exudes an erotic dynamism that no one else has the lung power to match. This album isn't just an ecstatic piece of party music ― it utterly redefines Houston as an artist." Newsweeks Allison Samuels wrote "No one of her generation sings with more character and conviction".

A reviewer from The Guardian commented that "[disc two] is eminently more listenable. The likes of "I Will Always Love You" and "Greatest Love of All" weren't just a waste of one of the potentially great soul voices; they opened the door for Celine Dion. But Houston remembers her gospel and R&B roots often enough to counterbalance the slush with rootsier offerings like "I'm Your Baby Tonight" and "It's Not Right But It's Okay". New duets with George Michael and Enrique Iglesias complete a couple of hours of diva-style fun." Steve Jones form USA Today rated the album four stars out of four, commenting that "Whitney: The Greatest Hits [...] puts its subject in context by smartly arranging the material so it's easy to follow Whitney Houston's 15 year progression from ingenue to mature singer. [...] The set does its job well." Billboard called it "quite [a] stellar collection", adding that "timing couldn't be better for this [...] career retrospective." In contrast, according to NME "[t]he timing couldn't be worse. Issuing a double CD of Whitney Houston's finest moments was intended to shore up her rapidly eroding soul diva supremacy against the rising tide of clued-up, modern successors to her throne – Missy Elliott, Lauryn Hill, Kelis." It rated the collection, however, five stars out of five.

LA Weekly reviewed the collection negatively, stating that "it's damn near unlistenable. The first of the two discs is the Cool Down side, i.e., the ballads. One track slides too smoothly into the next, with Whitney's voice — so strong, so assured, so boring — anchoring saccharine production and even sappier songwriting. [...] The 'Throw Down' disc is filled with astonishingly bad dance remixes of old hits[.]" According to Ebony, "Whitney: The Greatest Hits reminds listeners of the enormous talent this artist demonstrated on "You Give Good Love", how she has grown, and the fact she has a long career". Sonia Murray from the Atlanta Journal and Constitution graded the album a B+, commenting that "What makes Whitney Houston's first collection of hits great is her. [...] On the first CD there's her masterfully manipulated big pop confections ("I Will Always Love You"), the occasional, really soulful R&B tunes ("Saving All My Love for You") and new radio-ready duets with Whitney-in-training Deborah Cox and Latin smolderer Enrique Iglesias. The second CD of dance remixes is an appropriate nod to an artist who has held sway over so many genres. But without a gospel single from "The Preacher's Wife" soundtrack --- some of her most emotive work --- this isn't Whitney at her best." AllMusic reviewer Stephen Thomas Erlewine felt that the greatest hits album "The Essential Whitney Houston plays much like the bigger package Whitney: The Greatest Hits; even if it has a handful of songs not on the 2000 collection, it covers the same territory equally well and equally entertainingly." The Orlando Sentinel wrote that the "double album contains almost all of her hit singles from the past 15 years".

Commercial performance
Whitney: The Greatest Hits was released on May 16, 2000, to global commercial success. The album entered at No. 5 in the US Billboard 200 Album Chart and at No. 3 in the Top R&B/Hip Hop Albums chart for the week of June 3, 2000 with first week Nielsen SoundScan sales of 158,000 units, her highest solo album debut since Whitney in 1987. Approximately one month later, on June 20, 2000, it was certified 2× platinum in the United States by the RIAA, making the album her eighth consecutive multi-platinum record when including her three soundtrack albums.

Internationally the album's performance was even stronger. Whitney: The Greatest Hits entered the UK chart at No. 1, her first No. 1 record there since Whitney, as well as in Ireland. The album also entered in the Top 5 in Germany (#2), The Netherlands (#2), Belgium (#2), Switzerland (#2), Japan (#3), Austria (#3), Canada (#4) and Spain (#4). With consistently high sales across Europe, the album peaked at No. 2 in Billboard's Eurochart and ended 2000 as the No. 9 album in sales across Europe.

The album was noteworthy for Arista's extensive use of digital marketing, which was in its infancy at the time. The two-CD set came with a DVD featuring 23 videos, including interviews with Houston and Davis, behind-the-scenes footage of the photo shoot for the album's cover, and a clip of Houston's 1983 TV debut on The Merv Griffin Show. Ken Levy, Senior Vice President of Creative Services for Arista's parent company BMG Entertainment, told Billboard Magazine about the DVD's interactive features: "We think we have the first DVD where the artist comes out and talks to you." As a result of these innovations, the album's DVD was one of the "best-selling full-length DVD titles" in the music business in 2000. Whitney: The Greatest Hits also participated in Project Zeus, a Singapore-based initiative that launched one of the first pilots in secure digital music downloads. Finding a viable business model in digital music was an urgent priority for the industry given the rise of peer-to-peer networks such as Napster, which enabled fans to share music files for free.

Yet the album was still seen as a disappointment in the US compared to the mega-sales for compilation albums by top female artists in the 1990s, such as Mariah Carey's #1's (5 million units in the US, 15 million worldwide), Celine Dion's All the Way ... A Decade of Song (9 million in the US, 22 million worldwide) and Madonna's The Immaculate Collection (10 million in the US, 30 million worldwide). In fact, one of L.A. Reid's first meetings as president and CEO of Arista Records in the summer of 2000 was to "discuss the uncharacteristically meager sales of Whitney Houston's The Greatest Hits". Reid recounted of the album's launch:“I realized that this thing was headed nowhere, and we were going to spend a f*ing fortune,” Reid explains, his exasperation still fresh. The marketing plan for Houston, he continues, was poor: The record was released in mid-May, instead of later in the year when most superstar records appear, and key decisions about singles and videos were mishandled. “This whole project was just botched up, from the very beginning. This is what I walk into.” Reid, a sleek, personable 44-year-old, brakes himself. “Let me collect myself here.”In February 2012, following Houston's death, the album re-entered the US Billboard 200 Album Chart, reaching number 6. It sold nearly one million copies in 2012, twelve years after it was released. The album had previously sold approximately 4 million units prior to 2012.

In several countries worldwide, the album re-entered the top ten of many charts. In Canada, the album re-entered the charts and reached number 3 in 2012. On February 29, 2012, Houston became the first and only female act to ever place three albums in the Top Ten of the US  Billboard 200 Album Chart all at the same time with Whitney: the Greatest Hits at No. 2, The Bodyguard at No. 6, and Whitney Houston at No. 9.

On March 7, 2012, Houston claimed two more additional feats on the US Billboard charts: she became the first and only female act to place nine albums within the top 100(with Whitney: The Greatest Hits at No. 2, The Bodyguard at No. 5, Whitney Houston at No. 10, I Look to You at No. 13, Triple Feature at No. 21, My Love Is Your Love at No. 31, I'm Your Baby Tonight at No. 32, Just Whitney at No. 50 and The Preacher's Wife at No. 80).; in addition, other Houston albums were also on the US Billboard Top 200 Album Chart at this time.

Houston also became the second female act, after Adele, to place two albums in the top five of the US Billboard Top 200 with Whitney: The Greatest Hits at No. 2 and The Bodyguard at No. 5. Whitney: The Greatest Hits was one of the top selling albums of 2000 and is certified over 5× platinum in the US, with another 5 million sold internationally.

Promotional concerts
Following the release of her Greatest Hits album, Houston promoted it by performing three sold-out shows at Caesars in Atlantic City from June 30 to July 3, 2000. She performed an additional date during the fall on November 10, at the Aladdin Theatre in Las Vegas, with then-husband Bobby Brown opening the show. Both performers closed the show with their duet hit "Something in Common".

Set list

Bobby Brown
November 10

"My Prerogative"
"That's the Way Love Is"
"Roni"
"Rock Wit'cha"
"Every Little Step"
"Get Away"
"Don't Be Cruel"

Whitney Houston

"Get It Back"
"If I Told You That"
"Heartbreak Hotel"
Medley: "Saving All My Love for You" / "Until You Come Back"
"I Learned from the Best"
"Step by Step"
"I Wanna Dance with Somebody (Who Loves Me)"
"How Will I Know"
"I Love the Lord"
"I Go to the Rock"
Medley: "I Believe in You and Me" / "Why Does It Hurt So Bad" / "It Hurts Like Hell" (contain excerpts from "The Glory of Love")
"I Will Always Love You"
"Blessed Assurance"
"My Love Is Your Love" 
"Something in Common" 

Notes

Shows

Track listing

North American edition

International and European edition

DVD

Whitney: The Unreleased Mixes

Personnel
Adapted from AllMusic.

 Babyface –   producer, executive producer
 Anne Catalino – engineer
 John Clayton – arranger
 Robert Clivillés – mixing
 David Cole – mixing
 Tony Coluccio – mixing
 Chris Cox – mixing
 Deborah Cox – performer, vocals, background vocals
 Shep Crawford –   conductor, instrumentation, producer, vocal arrangement
 Dave Darlington – mixing
 Clive Davis – executive producer, producer
 Jon Douglas – mixing
 Dronez – remixing
 Jerry Duplessis – producer
 Peter Edge – A&R
 Faith Evans – performer, vocals
 Kamaal Fareed – producer
 Raul Flores – assistant engineer
 David Foster – arranger,   producer
 Hosh Gureli – A&R
 Hex Hector – mixing
 Whitney Houston –   executive producer, liner notes, producer, vocal arrangement, vocals
 Enrique Iglesias – performer, vocals
 Jermaine Jackson – performer, producer, vocals
 Wyclef Jean –   producer
 Jellybean – mixing, producer
 Rodney Jerkins –   instrumentation, producer
 Shae Jones –   background vocals
 K. Karlin –   arranger, producer
 Kashif – arranger, producer
 Tom Keane – producer
 Eric Kupper – keyboards
 Amy Linden – liner notes
 Steve Lipson – mixing, producer
 George O. Luksch – overdubs
 C.J. Mackintosh – mixing, producer
 Joe Mardin – conductor
 Michael Masser –   producer
 Al McDowell – bass, guitar
 George Michael – performer, producer
 Peter Mokran – mixing
 David Morales – mixing
 Erick "More" Morillo – mixing
 Mya – liner notes
 Keith Naftaly – A&R
 Jose Nunez – mixing
 Jonathan Peters – mixing
 Kelly Price – performer, vocal arrangement, vocals
 Mac Quayle – engineer, keyboards, mixing, programming
 Peter Rauhofer – producer, remixing
 Brian Rawling – mixing, re-produced, reproduction
 L.A. Reid –   producer
 Harry "Choo Choo" Romero – mixing
 Raphael Saadiq –   producer
 Jamie Seyberth – tracking
 Daryl Simmons –   producer
 Dexter Simmons – remixing
 Soulshock – arranger, producer
 Ren Swan – mixing engineer
 Mark Taylor – mixing, re-produced, reproduction
 Thunderpuss – remixing
 Lenny Underwood – keyboards
 Junior Vasquez – mixing
 Narada Michael Walden – producer
 Mervyn Warren – producer
 Jay Williams – guitar

Charts

Whitney: The Greatest Hits

Weekly charts

Monthly charts

Year-end charts

Decade-end charts

All-time charts

The Essential Whitney Houston

Weekly charts

Year-end charts

Certifications and sales

Whitney: The Greatest Hits album

Whitney: The Greatest Hits DVD

The Essential Whitney Houston

Accolades

2000

2001

Release history

See also
List of best-selling albums by women
List of number-one albums in 2000 (UK)
List of best-selling albums of the 2000s in the United Kingdom

References

External links

Whitney: The Greatest Hits at AllMusic
Whitney: The Greatest Hits at Discogs
The Essential at AllMusic
The Essential at Discogs
The Unreleased Mixes at AllMusic
The Unreleased Mixes at Discogs

Albums produced by Rodney Jerkins
Albums produced by Narada Michael Walden
Albums produced by David Foster
Albums produced by Michael Masser
Albums produced by Raphael Saadiq
Albums produced by Stephen Lipson
Albums produced by Wyclef Jean
Albums produced by DJ Quik
Albums produced by Q-Tip (musician)
2000 greatest hits albums
Whitney Houston compilation albums
2000 remix albums
Arista Records remix albums
Arista Records compilation albums
Albums produced by Mark Taylor (music producer)
Albums produced by Clive Davis
Albums produced by Whitney Houston